Zamania is a town in the Indian state of Uttar Pradesh. Its municipal council is subordinate to the Ghazipur District.

History

According to Hindu mythology, Zamania was the place where Rishi Jamadagni (father of Lord Parashurama) had his ashrama. Jamdagni Ashram was located near the banks of the Ganges, a few miles from the town of Zamania, where a tributary of the Ganges joins the river after covering parts of Gang Barar. During the reign of Akbar the Afghani, Ali Kuli Khan alias Khan Zaman took command of Ghazipur and founded Zamania. The place where Zamania stands belonged to the Nagsar family and was bought in 1630 by the Kusi family for Khizipur (Mathare). Ali Quli Khan bought 5,000 bighas of land from the family of Nagsar and built the town of Zamania. Ali Quli Khan's decedents later established Nasratpur and Sarai Murad Ali villages near Zamania. Until 1750, Zamania was a pargana of Kamsaar Raj. A notable zamindar of Zamania was Chaudhari Muhammad Azmal, who was an Amil of the Pargana in 1770-1790. Many villages bear the name The Chaudhari Azmal after one Chudhari Azmal. Chaudhari Azmal was one of the most charitable people of Ghazipur. Thereafter, in the late 1760s, Ghazipur came under the suzerainty of the Banaras state and Raja Balwant Singh, the son of Mansa Ram, became the king of Ghazipur. After the attack of Warren Hastings, the then Governor-General of the British, this area was ruled over by other British rulers. Lord Cornwallis, who was known for land reforms, came to visit and died of fever on October 5th, 1805. A tomb built in his memory is a tourist attraction in Ghazipur City.

This area gave birth to freedom fighters. The hero of the first Freedom Movement (popularly referred to as Sepoy Mutiny) Mangal Pandey was born here. The Nilha Sahib Revolt, where the farmers revolted against the British and set fire to various Indigo godowns, took place here. Ghazipur has played a major role in India’s struggle for freedom. The Sepoy Mutiny in 1857 was a violent uprising against British rule over India. The British did eventually put down the uprising, but not without tarnishing their reputation by using offensive techniques against the mutineers.

Demographics
As of 2011, Zamania had a population of 33,423. Males constitute 52.1% of the population and females 47.89%. Zamania has an average literacy rate of 64.56%, lower than the national average of 59.5%. Male literacy is 72%, and female literacy is 56.46%. In Zamania, 15.72% of the population is under 6 years of age.

Tehsil

Zamania Tehsil is a Tehsil in the Ghazipur District of Uttar Pradesh. According to Census information in 2011, the sub-district code of Zamania Tehsil is 00991. There are about 383 villages in the Zamania Tehsil.

See also
Arangi, Gazipur, Uttar Pradesh
Mednipur, Gazipur
Zamania Canal

References

 Cities and towns in Ghazipur district